The Stinson Detroiter was a six-seat cabin airliner for passengers or freight designed and built by the Stinson Aircraft Syndicate, later the Stinson Aircraft Corporation. Two distinct designs used the Detroiter name, a biplane and a monoplane.

Development
The first design from the Detroit-based Stinson Aircraft Syndicate was the Stinson SB-1 Detroiter, a four-seat cabin biplane with novel features such as cabin heating, individual wheel brakes and electric starter for the nose-mounted 220 hp (164 kW) Wright J-5 Whirlwind engine. It made its first flight on Jan 25th, 1926. The Harley Davidson brakes were demonstrated on a snowy maiden flight requiring wheel chains to be added to prevent skidding. This  aircraft was soon developed into the six-seat Stinson SM-1D Detroiter, a braced high-wing monoplane version which ultimately made quite a number of significant long-range flights. The aircraft was soon a success and it enabled Stinson to get $150,000 in public capital to incorporate the Stinson Aircraft Corporation on 4 May 1926.

Seventy-five of the Wright J-5-powered versions were built, followed by 30 Wright J-6-powered aircraft. From 1928, SM-1 aircraft were used on scheduled services by Paul Braniff's Braniff Air Lines and by Northwest Airways.

In 1930 a SM-1FS with a crew of three reached Bermuda from New York City, the first flight ever to the islands. Getting there the aircraft had to land twice, once because of darkness and later after running out of fuel. With a wing strut damaged, it was shipped back to New York.

In 1928 Stinson developed the smaller SM-2 Junior model to appeal to private owners.

Variants

SB-1 Detroiter
Original biplane version with a 220hp (164kW) Wright J-5 Whirlwind engine. 26 units built. Prototype sold to Horace Elgin Dodge, first production model sold to John Duval Dodge of Dodgeson.
SM-1D
High-wing monoplane version with a 220hp (164kW) Wright J-5 Whirlwind engine.
SM-1DA
As SM-1D with detailed improvements.
SM-1DB
As SM-1D with minor improvements
SM-1DC
As SM-1D with detailed improvements.
SM-1DD
Freighter variant with two seats and cargo-carrying interior, one built.
SM-1DE
Freighter variant with two seats and cargo-carrying interior, one built.
SM-1DX
variant powered with a 225hp Packard DR-980 Diesel engine, one built and first diesel powered aircraft to fly.
SM-1F
Variant from 1929 with a 300hp (224kW) Wright J-6 engine.
SM-1D300
SM-1Ds modified with a 300hp (224kW) Wright J-6 engine.
SM-1FS
Floatplane variant of the SM-1F.
SM-6B
A larger capacity six-seat variant with a 450hp (336kW) Pratt & Whitney Wasp C1 radial engine, two were built followed by eight more with eight-seat interiors.

Operators

 China National Aviation Corporation
 China Airways Federal
 Shanghai-Chengtu Airways (1920s–30s)

Faucett
Peruvian Air Force

Braniff Air Lines
North American Airways
Northwest Airways

Three aircraft of this model were bought by Honduran Air Force (1933)

Specifications (SM-1F)

See also

References
Notes

Bibliography

External links

 aerofiles
 

Detroiter
1920s United States civil utility aircraft
Single-engined tractor aircraft
High-wing aircraft
Aircraft first flown in 1926